The Church of St John the Evangelist is a Grade II* listed church situated in what is now the City of Bradford, in Yorkshire, England. A private chapel was constructed here in 1766, which later became a chapel of ease of the Church of England, usually known as Bierley Chapel. That was a misnomer in the sense that it lay not in the Bierley township, but in neighbouring Bowling; the name came from the North Bierley estate to which it was originally attached. In the middle of the 19th century it became a parish church with the current name.

History
To the north of Bierley, it was built in 1766 by John Carr as an estate chapel for Richard Richardson (1708–1781) of Bierley Hall. It was consecrated in 1824. In 1828 and 1831 it was enlarged, when the north transept and a west porch were added. A parish was attached to it in 1864. It is now a Grade II* listed building.

Chaplains to 1824
These included:

1767–c.1772 James Stillingfleet (1741–1826)
c.1772–c.1781 M. Ollerenshaw
From 1781, a number of chaplains (J. West and D. West, Dr. Bailey and his brother, William Wood of Tingley)
1787–c.1799 Thomas Wade
1799–1823 a number of chaplains (Balmforth, Booth, Gill, Morgan, Heslop, Grainger, Hollist, Barmby, Parkin, Johnson, Weddell, Clarkson and Beaumont).

1824–1867
Incumbents included:

1824 J. B. Cartwright
1826 George Stringer Bull
1839 John Barber

From 1868
 1868 C. W. N. Hyne
1912 Harold Joseph Rose Firth
1923 Arthur Frederic White
1938 Bernard Markham
1946 Leslie Anniss Pickett
1953 Reginald Stanley Landsdown
1961 Kenneth Targett
1964 Robert Coverdale Moorsom
1971 Hubert Tours Annear
1976 Geoffrey Edward Millar (1976-1991 Priest in Charge)
1991 Iain Robert Lane
2000 Vacancy
2002 Kevin Tromans
2008 David Kennedy
2015 Vacancy
2018 Paul Wheelhouse

Notes

External links
St John the Evangelist achurchnearyou page
St John the Evangelist home page

Buildings and structures in Bradford
Bierley